Liberation Day is a day marking the liberation of a place.

Liberation Day may also refer to:

 Liberation Day (video game), a 1998 video game
 Liberation Day (novel), a 2002 novel in the Nick Stone Missions series
 Liberation Day: Stories, a 2022 short story collection by George Saunders